The Nineteenth Amendment of the Constitution is an amendment of the Constitution of Ireland which permitted the state to be bound by the British–Irish Agreement (the bilateral portion of the Good Friday Agreement) and enabled the establishment of shared political institutions between Ireland and Northern Ireland. It also provided a mechanism for a further amendment to the Constitution upon a declaration by the government on the implementation of the Agreement, most notably by changing Articles 2 and 3 from the previous claim over the whole island of Ireland to an aspiration towards creating a united Ireland by peaceful means, "with the consent of a majority of the people, democratically expressed, in both jurisdictions in the island".

The amendment was effected by the Nineteenth Amendment of the Constitution Act 1998 (previously bill no. 24 of 1998) which was approved by referendum on 22 May 1998 and signed into law on 3 June of the same year.  The referendum was held on the same day as a Northern Ireland referendum on the Good Friday Agreement and a second referendum in the Republic of Ireland to ratify of the Amsterdam Treaty.  The Government declaration envisaged by the Nineteenth Amendment was made on 2 December 1999, bringing the changes to Articles 2 and 3 and certain other parts of the constitution into effect.

Background
The Good Friday Agreement in 1998 was a culmination of the Northern Ireland peace process. The agreement acknowledged nationalism and unionism as "equally legitimate, political aspirations". It comprised two agreements: the Multi-Party Agreement, between the parties of Northern Ireland; and the British-Irish Agreement, between the government of Ireland and the government of the United Kingdom of Great Britain and Northern Ireland. The Constitution needed to be amended to allow the Irish state to be bound by its provisions.

The government of Ireland also agreed to amend Articles 2 and 3; however, these changes would only take effect if the government were satisfied that it could make a declaration that the Agreement had taken effect. These changes would remove the claim of the state to the whole island of Ireland, while also providing a mechanism for a poll on a united Ireland. The government of the United Kingdom agreed changes to legislation, which were to be provided in the Northern Ireland Act 1998, for a border poll on the status of Northern Ireland.

Changes to the text

Initial changes after referendum (1998)
The Nineteenth Amendment added the text below as Article 29.7 to the constitution. Subsection 3º provides the detail of the amendments to be made to the text and are detailed further below. The text of subsections 3º, 4º and 5º, shown here in italics, are omitted from the published text of the Constitution.

Subsequent changes effected upon Government declaration (1999)
Upon the declaration of the government on 2 December 1999, and under the terms of 29.7.3º, the following changes were made to the text:

Deletion of the entirety of Articles 2 and 3:

and substitution of the Articles with the following:

Insertion of the following as Article 29.8 (see extraterritorial jurisdiction in Irish law):

Bill
A lay litigant named Denis Riordan launched a High Court challenge to the bill the week before the referendum. He claimed the bill was invalid because it purported to allow a mechanism to amend the Constitution by government declaration rather than by referendum. The court rejected the challenge on the grounds that the initial amendment would be by referendum and that by separation of powers the courts could not interfere in the legislative process.

Referendum result

After the referendum
The referendum returning officer certified the result in the High Court, which notified the Oireachtas, and the Nineteenth Amendment of the Constitution Act 1998 was signed into law by the President on 3 June 1998. This ipso facto effected the insertion of Article 28.7 of the Constitution and started the clock for the 12-month window (Article 28.7.5º) within which the British-Irish Agreement would be ratified.  The British-Irish Agreement Act 1999 served in Irish law to ratify the treaty and establish the associated cross-border institutions. The act was signed into law on 22 March 1999 but would not be commenced by the Taoiseach until the same date as the corresponding British law (the Northern Ireland Act 1998). Both were dependent on participation of the parties in Northern Ireland.

Political disagreements within Northern Ireland meant that establishment would not take place by the deadline of 2 June 1999, so the Oireachtas rushed through a 12-month extension ("such longer period as may be provided for by law" in Article 28.7.5º). A minor amendment to the British-Irish Agreement was signed on 18 June and the British-Irish Agreement Act 1999 was accordingly amended on 25 June. The institutions were established on 2 December 1999, when the Irish government commenced the British-Irish Agreement Act 1999 as amended, and the UK government simultaneously commenced the Northern Ireland Act 1998.  The Irish government accordingly made the declaration specified by Article 28.7.3º, triggering the replacement of Articles 2 and 3 of the Constitution, the insertion of Article 29.8, and the omission of the transitory subsections 3º–5º of Article 29.7.

Later developments
The provision in the amended Article 2 quoted above that "It is the entitlement and birthright of every person born in the island of Ireland, which includes its islands and seas, to be part of the Irish nation" was affected by the Twenty-seventh Amendment of the Constitution of Ireland, passed in 2004. That amendment did not alter the text of Article 2 but instead inserted a new section in Article 9 which limited the constitutional right to citizenship by birth to individuals with at least one Irish-citizen parent.

See also
1998 Northern Ireland Belfast Agreement referendum
Politics of the Republic of Ireland
History of the Republic of Ireland
History of Ireland
Partition of Ireland
Constitutional amendment
1998 Irish constitutional referendum

References

External links

Full text of the Constitution of Ireland

1998 in international relations
1998 in Irish law
1998 in Irish politics
1998 referendums
1999 in Irish law
1999 in Irish politics
19
History of Northern Ireland
Irish nationality law
Northern Ireland peace process
Politics of Northern Ireland
19
May 1998 events in Europe
Amendment, 19